Brad Suggs is a singer and songwriter, but best known as a guitarist that contributed greatly to the legacy of Phillips' Sun and Phillips' International labels. His name is widely unknown although he appeared on more than eight Sun and Phillips International records.

Biography

Early Years
Brad Suggs, born Luther Bradley "Pee Wee" Suggs (also known as "LB" and "Junior,") was born in 1933 in North Carolina. Suggs was one of twelve children born to his parents on their farm near Raleigh, North Carolina.

Career
Suggs first began playing guitar professionally with the Loden Family in North Carolina. Sonny James (born Sonny Loden) and Suggs moved to Memphis, Tennessee around 1950. When Suggs wasn't working in the studio he worked full-time at Sears. James wanted Suggs to go on the road touring with him, but Suggs decided not to due to family obligations.

Instead, Suggs began playing with the Slim Rhodes Band. He played with the Rhodes group on all their Sun recordings, as well as on eight tracks recorded in 1950 during the earliest days of the Memphis Recording Service (1). When Suggs began releasing singles Rockabilly was not a household word yet and the Sun label was still being shaped (trying to find its niche).

In 1959, Suggs began to work in the semi-official capacity of Sun producer and bandleader (1). It was at this time that his five singles were issued on the Phillips International label.  His other accomplishments include backing up Elvis Presley during the King’s homecoming concert on February 25, 1961. (Suggs can be seen playing guitar in the background of the famous picture of comedian George Jessell bowing at Elvis' feet during the concert.) He also worked with the Memphis Symphony Orchestra. Suggs’ recordings can be found on The Complete Sun Singles, Volumes 1, 2 and 6, issued by Bear Family Records.

Suggs appeared on more than eight Sun records (more than Elvis Presley, Billy Riley, Warren Smith, Jerry Lee Lewis, Johnny Cash, and Charlie Rich) (1). Suggs also sang and got label credit on "Don’t Believe" (Sun 216),  "Are You Ashamed of Me?" (Sun 225), and "Bad Girl" (Sun 238), which were recorded with the Slim Rhodes' band.

Discography

Singles
Suggs' singles include: "706 Union," "Low Outside," "I Walk The Line" (an instrumental release that was a retread of the famous Cash hit), "Ooh Wee," "Cloudy," "Sam’s Tune," "My Gypsy," and "Elephant Walk."

Other
It can be confirmed that at least Suggs’ guitar playing appears on the following recordings (1):

Jerry Lee Lewis—"I Could Never Be Ashamed Of You" (Sun 330)
Hillbilly Music (Sun LP 1265)
"When I Get Paid" (Sun 352)
Hello Josephine (LP 1265)
"I’ve Been Twisting" (Sun 374)
"I Know What It Means" (Sun 396)
Jack Clement—"The Black Haired Man" (Sun 311)
Jerry McGill—"Lovestruck" (Sun 326)
Johnny Powers—"Be Mine, All Mine" (Sun 327)
Slim Rhodes—"Do What I Do" (Sun 256)
Billy Riley—"One More Time" (Sun 322)
Charlie Rich—"School Days" (PI 3560)
"Midnight Blues" (PI 3576)
Warren Smith—"Black Jack David" (Sun 250)
"Ubangi Stomp" (Sun 250)
Jeb Stewart—"I Bet You’re Gonna Like It" (PI 3575)
Vernon Taylor—"Mystery Train" (Sun 325)
Hayden Thompson—"Rockabilly Girl" (originally unissued)
Thomas Wayne—"I’ve Got It Made" (PI 3577)
Ray Smith—several sessions/unknown titles

References

External links 
  The Original Sun Records
  Slim Rhodes Band Records
  Brad Suggs' Bio
  Billboard April 16, 1955
 King's homecoming concert Feb. 25, 1961

American rockabilly musicians
1933 births
Living people
Guitarists from North Carolina
American male guitarists
20th-century American guitarists
Country musicians from North Carolina
20th-century American male musicians